Ellar Coltrane Kinney Salmon (born August 27, 1994) is an American actor.  They are best known for their role as Mason Evans Jr. in Richard Linklater's film Boyhood, for which they won the Critics' Choice Movie Award for Best Young Performer.

Life and career
Coltrane was born in Austin, Texas, to Genevieve (née Kinney), an equine-assisted therapist for autistic people, and Bruce Salmon, a musician. Their parents divorced when they were nine, and their mother subsequently remarried. Coltrane's half-sister, Evelyn, was born when they were eleven.

In 2001, at age six, Coltrane was cast by filmmaker Richard Linklater to play the title character of sorts of the film Boyhood; Linklater wanted to make an unprecedented film that would show a boy's coming of age, but with the actors growing up or aging on screen. Coltrane and other members of the cast were filmed intermittently for several days at a time between May 2002 and August 2013, by which time they'd turned 19; there were 45 days of filming altogether. During Coltrane's childhood, they also appeared in various other films, including a small role in Linklater's 2006 film Fast Food Nation.

In 2016, Coltrane appeared in the Barack Obama drama film Barry, which premiered at the Toronto International Film Festival. The following year, they co-starred with Emma Watson in James Ponsoldt's film adaptation of the Dave Eggers novel The Circle (2017), which premiered at the Tribeca Film Festival.

Personal life

Coltrane uses singular they pronouns. Coltrane has spoken of their discomfort with binary gender roles: "For me, the binary gender demarcation always has felt just kind of like … a charade, like this character that I have to play.”

Filmography

References

External links

 

1994 births
21st-century American actors
American child actors
American film actors
Living people
Actors from Austin, Texas
American non-binary actors